Sphenomorphus orientalis  is a species of skink found in Myanmar.

References

orientalis
Reptiles described in 1940
Taxa named by Benjamin Shreve
Reptiles of Myanmar